The Cincinnati Ladyhawks was a soccer club based in Cincinnati, Ohio that played in the W-League. The team was founded in 1999 by Tom Westfall and Dr. Stephen Dailey and stated play in 2000 as the sister franchise to then Cincinnati men's soccer franchise, the Cincinnati Riverhawks. The team originally played in the W-2 League. When the Riverhawks folded in 2003 the Ladyhawks were expected to fold as well but they didn't. Beginning in 2003, the team moved their games to Lakota West High School's soccer stadium as well as moving into the newly formed W-League (basically the W2 league with a few differences) which replaced the WUSA (who suspended operations that year) as the top level of women's soccer in the US. Following the 2006 season the team quietly suspended operations but has said they expected to return, but that hasn't happened.

Year-by-year

External links
Official Website-hasn't been updated for two years
W-League Official Website

Women's soccer clubs in the United States
L
Soccer clubs in Ohio
Defunct USL W-League (1995–2015) teams
2006 disestablishments in Ohio
Association football clubs established in 1999
Association football clubs disestablished in 2006
1999 establishments in Ohio
Women's sports in Ohio